Sorkhanjub may refer to various villages in Iran:

Sorkhanjub-e Olya
Sorkhanjub-e Sofla